Taurida Oblast (Tavricheskaya oblast′) was an oblast (province) of the Russian Empire. It roughly corresponded to most of the Crimean Peninsula and parts of the Southern Ukraine regions. It was created out of territories of the Crimean Khanate, which Russia annexed in 1783. In 1796 it was merged into the Novorossiya Governorate. The name Taurida comes from the old Greek name for the area, Tauris, as in ancient times several Greek city-states had developed colonial outposts in the area.

The oblast was created under the Imperial ukase of February 1784 signed by Catherine the Great. The administrative seat of the region was declared the city of Simferopol. Before 1784, Qarasuvbazar served as a temporary administrative center.

Administrative structure
The oblast was divided into seven counties (uyezd).
 Dnieper county – centered in Aleshki (Oleshky)
 Levkopol county – centered in Levkopol (Feodosiya)
 Melitopol county – centered in Melitopol (since 1791 in Great Tokmak)
 Perekop county – centered in Perekop
 Phanagoria (Tmutarakan) county – centered in Phanagoria
 Simferopol county – centered in Simferopol
 Yevpatoria county – centered in Yevpatoriya.

In 1787 Levkopol and Levkopol county were renamed into Feodosiya and Feodosiya county respectfully. In 1791 an administrative seat of Melitopol county was moved to Great Tokmak.

On 12 December 1796 the oblast was abolished, its territory was redivided into two counties (Aqmescit (former Simferopol) and Perekop) and passed to the Novorossiya Governorate. The city of Simferopol name was changed to Aqmescit.

References

Oblasts of the Russian Empire
Crimea in the Russian Empire
States and territories established in 1860
States and territories disestablished in 1918
Political history of Crimea